The Cork Senior A Football Championship (known for sponsorship reasons as Bon Secours Cork County Senior A Football Championship and abbreviated to the Cork SAFC) is an annual club Gaelic football competition organised by the Cork County Board of the Gaelic Athletic Association from 2020 for the second tier senior Gaelic football teams in the county of Cork in Ireland.

The series of games are played between the spring and autumn months, including a summer break, with the county final being played at Páirc Uí Chaoimh in October. The championship includes a round robin followed by a knockout stage.

St. Michael's are the title holders, beating Knocknagree by 2-07 to 0-06 in the 2022 final.

History

Development
On 26 March 2019, three championship proposals were circulated to Cork club delegates after an expensive review process of the entire Cork championship system. A core element running through all three proposals, put together by the Cork GAA games workgroup, was that there be a group stage of 12 teams, as well as straight relegation and promotion. On 2 April 2019, a majority of 136 club delegates voted for Option A which provided for one round of games played in April and two more in August – all with inter-county players available. The decision meant that, for the first time since 1887, the top tier of Cork football was split in two into the Cork Premier Senior Championship and the Cork Senior A Championship.

Beginnings
The inaugural championship was scheduled to begin in April 2020, however, it was postponed indefinitely due to the coronavirus pandemic in Ireland. When the championship resumed, time constraints led to a revision of the format, with the play-offs for the second best and third best third placed teams being abolished. The knockout stage was further reduced, with the two best-ranking teams from the group stage receiving byes to the semi-finals and the other four qualifying teams contesting two lone quarter-finals. The very first match eventually took place on 24 July 2020, with Bandon claiming a 1-12 to 0-06 victory over Clyda Rovers. Bandon's Mark O'Regan scored the very first championship point before later scoring the championship's very first goal.

Regular format

Group stage
The 12 teams are divided into three groups of four. Over the course of the group stage, which features one game in April and two games in August, each team plays once against the others in the group, resulting in each team being guaranteed at least three games. Two points are awarded for a win, one for a draw and zero for a loss. The teams are ranked in the group stage table by points gained, then scoring difference and then their head-to-head record. The top two teams in each group qualify for the knock-out stage.

Knockout stage

Play-off: The second best and third best third placed teams from the group stage play off for last quarter-final place.

Quarter-finals: The play-off winner and the seven top-ranking teams from the group stage contest this round. The four winners from these four games advance to the semi-finals.

Semi-finals: The four quarter-final winners contest this round. The two winners from these four games advance to the semi-finals.

Final: The two semi-final winners contest the final. The winning team are declared champions.

Promotion and relegation
At the end of the championship, the winning team is automatically promoted to the Cork Premier Senior Championship for the following season. The three bottom-placed teams from the group stage take part in a series of play-offs, with the losing team being relegated to the Cork Premier Intermediate Championship.

2023 Teams

Sponsorship
In July 2020, Bon Secours Hospital were unveiled as the title sponsor of the Cork Senior A Championship.

Trophy and medals
The Kevin McTernan Cup is the current prize for winning the championship. It was donated in June 2021 to honour Kevin McTernan who served as a St Finbarr's player and selector. Daniel Goulding of Éire Óg was the first recipient of the cup when it was presented to him after the 2020 final.

Traditionally, at Páirc Uí Chaoimh, the victory presentation takes place at a special rostrum in the main grandstand. The cup is decorated with ribbons in the colours of the winning team. During the game the cup actually has both teams' sets of ribbons attached and the runners-up ribbons are removed before the presentation. The winning captain accepts the cup on behalf of his team before giving a short speech. Individual members of the winning team then have an opportunity to come to the rostrum to lift the cup, which is held by the winning team until the following year's final. 

In accordance with GAA rules, the County Board awards a set of gold medals to the championship winners. The medals depict a stylised version of the Cork GAA crest.

List of finals

Roll of honour

By Division

Records and statistics

Top scorers

All time

By year

In a single game

In finals

References

 
Gaelic football competitions in County Cork
Senior Gaelic football county championships